Juan Bonilla may refer to:

 Juan Bonilla (baseball) (born 1955), Puerto Rican baseball player
 Juan Bonilla (bishop) (1636–1696), bishop of Ariano, 1689–96
 Juan Bonilla (writer) (born 1966), Spanish writer
 Juan Crisóstomo Bonilla (1835–1884), Mexican general
 Juan C. Bonilla (municipality), a municipality in Puebla, Mexico

Bonilla, Juan